The 1974 Akron Zips football team represented Akron University in the 1974 NCAA Division II football season as an independent. Led by second-year head coach Jim Dennison, the Zips played their home games at the Rubber Bowl in Akron, Ohio. They finished the season with a record of 5–5 and were outscored by their opponents 162–197.

Schedule

References

Akron
Akron Zips football seasons
Akron Zips football